DJ Kayz  a French/Algerian DJ of kabylie origin born in Algeria, famous for his music mix series Oran Mix Party, Kabylifornie and the album series Paris Oran New York in three CDs (2013-2014-2015), collaborating with a great number of artists. He started DJing in 1995 and his debut mixtape was a precursor of the emerging fusion sound of raï & R&B gaining momentum in the early 2000s like in his participation in R&B Funk Raï Summer Show 2003 in competition with similar artists like Kore and his series Raï'n'B Fever. DJ Kayz mixes North African and Mediterranean flavors becoming popular in various venues and taking part in tours in France and in the Maghreb countries.

Discography

Albums

Mixes
2005: Oran Mix Party
2006: Oran Mix Party Vol. 2
2007: Oran Mix Party Vol. 3
2009: Oran Mix Party Vol. 4
2010: Oran Mix Party Vol. 5
2011: Oran Mix Party Vol. 6
2011: Kabylifornie (Mixés par DJ Kayz) 
2011: Kabylifornie, Vol. 2 (Mixés par DJ Kayz)
2012: Oran Mix Party Vol. 7
2012: The Best of DJ Kayz (compilation album)
2016: Best of Oran Mix Party (compilation album)

Singles
(Selective, charting releases)

*Did not appear in the official Belgian Ultratop 50 charts, but rather in the bubbling under Ultratip charts.

Featured in

Other songs

References

External links
Facebook

French DJs
Living people
French people of Algerian descent
French people of Kabyle descent
Year of birth missing (living people)